Kayal is a 2014 Indian Tamil-language adventure romance film directed by Prabhu Solomon and produced by Madhan of Escape Artists Motion Pictures.  The film stars newcomers Chandran, Anandhi and Vincent, while D. Imman composed the film's music. The film, set against the backdrop of the 2004 Indian Ocean earthquake and tsunami, released on 25 December 2014. The film was dubbed and released in Telugu as Tholi Premalo in 2016.

Plot 
The story revolves around two friends who work hard, and spend their money travelling around the country. On one such trip, they accidentally help a pair of lovers elope, without realising it.

The family of the eloped young lady get angry, and suspect them of being friends of the eloped young man. They take the two friends home, and try to beat them to get the truth out them. One of the two friends falls for a girl named Kayal, who is working in the house, and he speaks of his love in front of everyone.

After the eloped young lady is brought home, and it is proven that the two friends were not involved in planning the elopement, they are allowed to go. Kayal travels to Kanyakumari to find the guy who loved her. The rest of the film tells of how they united, after many struggles.

Cast 

 Chandran as Aaron
 Anandhi as Kayalvizhi
 Vincent as Socrates
 Divya Prabha as Divya
 Yaar Kannan as Prabhakar
 Bharathi Kannan as Inspector Mani
 Meghna Vincent as Meghna
 Devaraj as Deva
 Aarthi
 Imman Annachi
 Florent Pereira as Kayalvizhi's father
 Mime Gopi as Vakkeel
 Gemini Rajeshwari
 Jacob
 Vetrivel Raja
 Balasubramanian
 Emey
 Prabhu as Ramkumar (guest appearance)

Production 
Following the success of Kumki, Prabhu Solomon took a break and went on a recce to the coastal South Indian town of Nagapattinam to get inspired for a story set on the backdrop of the 2004 Indian Ocean earthquake and tsunami. He gathered real-life stories of survival and intertwined them into his script. The film was announced at a launch event at Leela Palace on 11 September 2013 with Prabhu Solomon announcing a fresh cast while revealing D. Imman would be composer and a debutant Vetrivel Mahendran would be cinematographer. Chandran was cast after sending his pictures to Prabhu Solomon, unaware if it was for the lead role. He got a reply the following day confirming he would be the lead actor, and subsequently lost fifteen kilograms to fit the character. Telugu actress Rakshita was rechristened as Anandhi for the film, and was selected after auditioning twice before impressing Solomon. The shoot of the film commenced in Ponneri in September 2013 and the team announced that scenes would be shot all across India including scenes at Kanyakumari and Ladakh. Scenes were shot for several days underwater, with the team often doing up to ten hours a day in knee-length depths of water. The film completed shoot after 85 days in May 2014, with the director announcing that post-production would be extensive as a result of impending VFX works. After filming finished, Prabhu Solomon revealed that the film's climax would show the 2004 Indian Ocean earthquake and tsunami and noted that the film would be dedicated to victim's families.

During the music release of the film in November 2014, Prabhu Solomon revealed more details about the production of the film. He noted that the climax was shot first to ensure graphic works depicting the tsunami could have as much time spent on it as possible. He went on to add that it was his costliest production till date and the film was made at a cost of 15 crore, with the special effects, notably the use of 7.1 Atmos mix for the climax, being particularly expensive.

Release 
The satellite rights of the film were sold to Zee Thamizh.

Critical reception 
The film opened on 25 December 2014 to critical acclaim and won positive reviews. Rediff gave 3 stars out of 5, calling Kayal "a sweet and endearing tale of love with characters that touch your heart, haunting locales, beautiful music and emotions that are simple and true. A thoughtfully-written script packed with honest emotions, plenty of humour, potent dialogues and excellent performances make Kayal worth a watch". Sify called the film a "feel-good love story" and went on to add that it has "some terrific visuals, great music and stunning climax. Prabhu Solomon has delivered an irresistible love story between an innocent girl and a free spirited young man set against the backdrop of Tsunami".

The Hindu's Baradwaj Rangan wrote, "The central emotion..., the great love between Aaron and Kayal, is too wispy to warrant all this drama, which is constantly underlined by a score that just won’t stop. We’re meant to feel their pain, their pining, but all we feel is the film straining to be an epic". The Times of India gave the film 3 stars out of 5 and wrote, "The first half of Kayal has some of the better aspects you find in a Prabu Solomon film...However, the director's bad habits start creeping in midway into the film and things start getting implausible and heavy-handed", going on to state that "the use of the 2004 Indian Ocean tsunami, which is the backdrop the director has chosen to tell this story, feels exploitative as the tragedy that followed hardly registers on screen". Indiaglitz.com, while giving it also 3 out of 5, wrote, "the movie got loads of positives and it is watchable for sure, but it also makes the viewer think, how long will Prabhu Solomon takes the same route to achieve success?"

Cinemalead rated a 3.5 out of 5 and reviewed," Kayal is a technically well-made film, which was equally backed up by some awesome performances. A hat trick for Prabhu Solomon."

Soundtrack 

The film's music was composed by D. Imman, who collaborated with Prabhu Solomon following previous successful albums in Mynaa (2010) and Kumki (2012). The audio was launched on 13 November 2014 at Sathyam Cinemas with the principal cast and crew in attendance, alongside special guests Arya, Sivakarthikeyan, Amala Paul and Anjali. The album opened to positive reviews from critics, with Behindwoods.com stating that the "Imman — Prabhu combo strikes gold yet again", while acknowledging that "expectations were high".

References

External links 
 

2014 films
2010s Tamil-language films
Indian romantic drama films
Indian disaster films
Disaster films based on actual events
Films about tsunamis
2010s disaster films
2014 romantic drama films
Films shot in Tamil Nadu
Films shot in Ladakh
Films scored by D. Imman
Films directed by Prabhu Solomon